Alexis Raúl Guerrera (born 2 February 1971) is an Argentine teacher and politician. He was Minister of Transport of Argentina from 2021 to 2022, in the cabinet of President Alberto Fernández; he was appointed following the death of his predecessor, Mario Meoni, in a car accident on 23 April 2021. He previously served as president of Trenes Argentinos Infraestructura, a state-owned subsidiary of Ferrocarriles Argentinos.

Guerrera also previously served as intendente (mayor) of his hometown of General Pinto from 2003 to 2019. A former member of the Justicialist Party and the Front for Victory, Guerrera joined the Renewal Front in 2016.

Early life and career
Guerrera was born on 2 February 1971 in General Pinto, a partido in the North-west of Buenos Aires Province. In his youth he joined the Justicialist Party's Peronist Youth, becoming the secretary-general of the General Pinto Peronist Youth aged 25. He served as a member of the General Pinto city council and, in 2003, Guerrera became intendente (mayor) of General Pinto as a member of the Front for Victory coalition.

In 2016, Guerrera joined the Renewal Front led by Sergio Massa. In 2019, as a member of the newly formed Frente de Todos (of which the Renewal Front is part), Guerrera was elected as a member of the Buenos Aires Province Chamber of Deputies in the Fourth Electoral Section.

In 2020, Guerrera was appointed president of Trenes Argentinos Infraestructura (also known as ADIF, a state-owned train infrastructure company), succeeding Ricardo Lissalde. Following the death of Transport Minister Mario Meoni in a car accident on 23 April 2021, Guerrera was appointed as the new Minister of Transport of Argentina on 3 May 2021.

Minister of Transport
Guerrera has stated his opposition to the nationalization of the Paraná-Paraguay riverway.

In November 2022, Guerrera announced he would step down from his position in the ministry due to health reasons. He was replaced by Diego Giuliano, also of the Renewal Front.

Personal life
Guerrera is openly gay. During his term as member of the Provincial Chamber of Deputies, Guerrera presided the parliamentary commission on gender and diversity and sponsored one of the province's anti-discrimination bills.

Electoral history

Executive

Legislative

References

External links

Official website of the Ministry of Transport (in Spanish)

1971 births
Living people
Argentine LGBT politicians
Argentine gay men
Gay politicians
Buenos Aires Province politicians
Mayors of places in Argentina
Members of the Buenos Aires Province Chamber of Deputies
Justicialist Party politicians
Renewal Front politicians
Transport ministers of Argentina